The 1978–79 NBA season was the Detroit Pistons' 31st season in the NBA, 22nd season in the metropolitan area of Detroit, first at the Pontiac Silverdome in Pontiac, Michigan, and first in the Eastern Conference.

New Coach Dick Vitale did little to revitalize the direction of the franchise as the team finished with a 30-52 (.366) record, 4th place in the Central Division.  Vitale was even hospitalized with stress during the season.  The team was led by point guard Kevin Porter, who led the league with 13.4 assists per game, forward M.L. Carr (18.7 ppg, 7.4 rpg), center Bob Lanier (23.6 ppg, 9.3 rpg, NBA All-Star, limited to 53 games due to injury), and the addition of two rookies Vitale drafted from the University of Detroit, where he had coached previously - John Long (16.1 ppg) and Terry Tyler (12.9 ppg, 2.5 blocks per game).

Draft picks

Roster

Regular season

Season standings

z - clinched division title
y - clinched division title
x - clinched playoff spot

Record vs. opponents

Season

Awards and records
M. L. Carr, NBA All-Defensive Second Team
Terry Tyler, NBA All-Rookie Team 1st Team

References

Detroit Pistons seasons
Detroit
Detroit Pistons
Detroit Pistons